Diagonal ZeroZero (also Torre Diagonal ZeroZero, Diagonal 00) is a skyscraper in Barcelona, Catalonia, Spain. It was designed by Emba Estudi Massip-Bosch arquitectes in Barcelona, founded and led by Enric Massip-Bosch.

Diagonal ZeroZero hosts the corporate headquarters in Catalonia of Telefónica Group, as well as its Research and Development Center. The building is built on land owned by the City of Barcelona, was developed by the public agency Consorci de la Zona Franca, and leased to Telefónica Group.

Diagonal Zero Zero is an example of high-tech architecture. Its structure, calculated by the engineering firm MC2-Julio Martínez Calzón, was erected in eight months, working in three shifts a day, seven days a week. For a few months there were over 450 workers operating simultaneously on-site. The total construction time, after an initial phase in which works were stopped for few months, amounted to two years until inauguration.

The structure of the building is a variation of the tube-in-tube scheme, in which the core (or inner 'tube') is built in concrete, and the perimeter structure (or outer 'tube') is built in steel. This perimeter structure is split in two rings: an interior vertical structure of very slender H pillars (10x10cm in the upper half of the tower, 14x14 cm in the lower half, under the 13th floor hosting the technical floor), placed every 135 cm; and an exterior bracing lattice supporting the torsion and flexing stresses of the tower produced by wind or earthquakes.

See also 

 List of tallest buildings and structures in Barcelona

References 

Headquarters in Spain
Office buildings completed in 2011
Telefónica
High-tech architecture
Skyscraper office buildings in Barcelona